This is a bibliography of works on the military history of the United States.

Surveys

 Allison, William T. Jeffrey G. Grey, Janet G. Valentine. American Military History: A Survey from Colonial Times to the Present (2nd ed. 2012) 416pp

 Anderson, Fred, ed. The Oxford Companion to American Military History (2000)

 Black, Jeremy. Fighting for America: The Struggle for Mastery in North America, 1519-1871 (2011)
 Boyne, Walter J. Beyond the Wild Blue: A History of the U.S. Air Force, 1947–2007 (2007)  excerpt and text search, popular
 Chambers, ed. John Whiteclay. The Oxford Guide to American Military History (1999) 
 Futrell, Robert Frank. Ideas, Concepts, Doctrine: A History of Basic Thinking in the United States Air Force (2 vol. 1979)
 Doughty, Robert. American Military History and the Evolution of Western Warfare, (1996) 

 Hearn, Chester G. Air Force: An Illustrated History: The U.S. Air Force from 1910 to the 21st Century (2008), popular  excerpt and text search
 Howarth, Stephen. To Shining Sea: A History of the United States Navy, 1775–1998 (1999) excerpt and text search; a standard history
 Huston, James A. The Sinews of War: Army Logistics, 1775-1953 (1966), U.S. Army; 755pp   
 Love, Robert W.  History of the U.S. Navy, 1775–1941 (1992) and History of the U.S. Navy, 1942–1991 (1992)  vol 1 excerpt and text search;  vol 2 excerpt and text search; a standard history
 Matloff, Maurice, ed. American Military History (1996) full text online; standard textbook used in ROTC; Now replaced by Richard Stewart 2010
 Millett, Allan R., and Peter Maslowski, and William B. Feis. For the common defense: a military history of the United States of America (3rd ed. 2013)
 Millett, Allan R. Semper Fidelis. A History of the United States Marine Corps (1991)
 
 Muehlbauer, Matthew S., and David J. Ulbrich. Ways of War: American Military History from the Colonial Era to the Twenty-First Century (Routledge, 2013), 536pp; university textbook; online review
 Stewart, Richard W. American military history (2 vol 2010)

 Weigley, Russell Frank. History of the United States army (1967)
 Weigley, Russell Frank. The American Way of War: A History of United States Military Strategy and Policy, (1977) excerpt and text search

Historiography
 Ferris, John. "Coming in from the cold war: The historiography of American intelligence, 1945–1990." Diplomatic History 19.1 (1995): 87-115.
 
 Grimsley, Mark. "The American military history master narrative: Three textbooks on the American military experience," Journal of Military History (2015) 79#3 pp 782–802; review of Allison, Millett, and Muehlbauer textbooks
 
 
 Millett, Allan R. "The Korean War: A 50‐year critical historiography." Journal of Strategic Studies 24.1 (2001): 188-224 online.
 Romero, Federico. "Cold War historiography at the crossroads." Cold War History 14.4 (2014): 685-703.

Atlases

 Esposito, Vincent J. West Point Atlas of American Wars. New York: Frederick A. Praeger, 1959.
 Esposito, Vincent J. The West Point Atlas of American Wars: 1900-1918 (1997), covers entire war, not just US role
 Griess, Thomas E. Atlas for the Second World War: Europe and the Mediterranean (2002)
 Griess, Thomas E. West Point Atlas for the Second World War: Asia and the Pacific (2002)
 Griess, Thomas E. West Point Atlas for the American Civil War (2002)
 Griess, Thomas E. The West Point Atlas for Modern Warfare (2011)
 Griess, Thomas E. West Point Atlas for the Great War: Strategies and Tactics of the First World War (2003)
 Murray, Stuart. Atlas of American Military History (2005)

Pre 1775

 Anderson, Fred. The War That Made America: A Short History of the French and Indian War (2006) excerpt and text search
 Grenier, John. The First Way of War: American War Making on the Frontier, 1607–1814 (Cambridge University Press, 2005).
 
 
 Starkey, A. European and Native American Warfare, 1675–1815 (University of Oklahoma Press, 1998)
 Steele, Ian. Warpaths: Invasions of North America (Oxford University Press, 1994).
 Tucker, Spencer C., James Arnold, and Roberta Wiener eds. The Encyclopedia of North American Colonial Conflicts to 1775: A Political, Social, and Military History (2008) excerpt and text search

1775–1800

 Alden, John R.  A History of the American Revolution (1989), general survey; strong on military
 Black, Jeremy. America as a Military Power: From the American Revolution to the Civil War (2002) online edition
 Carp, E. Wayne. "Early American Military History: A Review of Recent Work", Virginia Magazine of History and Biography, 94 (1986), pp. 259–84.
 Fremont-Barnes, Gregory, and Richard A. Ryerson, eds. The Encyclopedia of the American Revolutionary War: A Political, Social, and Military History (ABC-CLIO, 2006) 5 volume paper and online editions; 1000 entries by 150 experts, covering all topics
 Higginbotham, Don. The War of American Independence: Military Attitudes, Policies, and Practice, 1763–1789 (1971, 1983). an analytical history of the war online via ACLS Humanities E-Book.
 Lancaster, Bruce. The American Revolution (American Heritage Library) (1985), heavily illustrated
 Maass, John R. Defending a New Nation, 1783-1811 . Washington, D.C.: United States Army Center of Military History, 2013. 
 McCullough, David (2005). 1776. New York, New York: Simon & Schuster.
 Middlekauff, Robert.  The Glorious Cause: The American Revolution, 1763–1789 (2nd ed 2007) online edition

1800–1860

 Bauer K. Jack. The Mexican War, 1846–1848. (1974), good on military action.
 Black, Jeremy. America as a Military Power: From the American Revolution to the Civil War (2002) online edition
 Crawford, Mark et al. eds.  Encyclopedia of the Mexican War (1999)
 Frazier, Donald S. ed. The U.S. and Mexico at War, (1998), 584; an encyclopedia with 600 articles by 200 scholars
 Heidler, Donald & Jeanne T. Heidler  (eds) Encyclopedia of the War of 1812 (2nd ed 2004) 636pp; most comprehensive guide to this war; 500 entries by 70 scholars from several countries
 Heidler, David S. and Heidler, Jeanne T.  The War of 1812. (2002). 217 pp.  short survey
 Heidler, David S. and Heidler, Jeanne T.  The Mexican War. (2005). 225 pp.  basic survey, with some key primary sources
 Herrera, Ricardo A. For Liberty and the Republic: The American Citizen as Soldier, 1775-1861 (New York University Press, 2015) online review
 Hickey, Donald R. Don't Give Up the Ship! Myths of the War of 1812. (2006)
 Hickey, Donald R. The War of 1812: A Forgotten Conflict. (1990), standard scholarly history
 Johnson, Timothy D. Winfield Scott: The Quest for Military Glory (1998)
 McCaffrey, James M. Army of Manifest Destiny: The American Soldier in the Mexican War, 1846–1848 (1994)excerpt and text search
 Quimby, Robert S., The US Army in the War of 1812: an operational and command study (1997) online version
 Roosevelt, Theodore. The Naval War of 1812 (1882)  full text online, by the future president
 Smith, Justin H. The War with Mexico  2 vol  (1919); Pulitzer Prize; 2:233-52; online vol 1;  online vol 2 Pulitzer Prize winner.
 Winders, Richard Price. Mr. Polk's Army (1997) excerpt and text search, focus on the soldiers

Civil War

 Beringer, Richard E., Archer Jones, and Herman Hattaway. The Elements of Confederate Defeat: Nationalism, War Aims, and Religion (1988)
 Carter, Alice E. and Richard Jensen. The Civil War on the Web: A Guide to the Very Best Sites (2nd ed. 2003) excerpt and text search
 Catton, Bruce. Centennial History of the Civil War (3 vols. 1961–65); Catton has many very well written books on the war
 Current, Richard N., et al. eds. Encyclopedia of the Confederacy (1993) (4 Volume set; also 1 vol abridged version)
 Donald, David et al. The Civil War and Reconstruction (2001); 700 pages
 Faust, Patricia L., ed. Historical Times Illustrated Encyclopedia of the Civil War (1986) 2000 short entries
 Fellman, Michael et al. This Terrible War: The Civil War and its Aftermath (2nd ed. 2007), 544 pages
 Heidler, David Stephen, ed. Encyclopedia of the American Civil War: A Political, Social, and Military History (2002), 1600 entries in 2700 pages in 5 vol or 1-vol editions
 McPherson, James M. Battle Cry of Freedom: The Civil War Era (1988), 900 pages; excerpt and text search; also complete online edition, Pulitzer Prize; comprehensive history
 Nevins, Allan. Ordeal of the Union, an 8-volume set (1947–1971). the most detailed political, economic and military narrative; by Pulitzer Prize winner
vol 1. Fruits of Manifest Destiny, 1847–1852; 2. A House Dividing, 1852–1857; 3. Douglas, Buchanan, and Party Chaos, 1857–1859; 4. Prologue to Civil War, 1859–1861; 5. The Improvised War, 1861–1862; 6. War Becomes Revolution, 1862–1863; 7. The Organized War, 1863–1864; 8. The Organized War to Victory, 1864–1865 
 Rhodes, James Ford. History of the Civil War, 1861–1865 (1918), old, accurate survey; won Pulitzer prize
 Shannon, Fred. The Organization and Administration of the Union Army 1861–1865 (2 vol 1928) vol 1 excerpt and text search;   vol 2 excerpt and text search
 Symonds, Craig L. and William J. Clipson. A Battlefield Atlas of the Civil War (1993) schematic maps that are easy to understand

1865–1917

 Abrahamson, James L. America Arms for a New Century: The Making of a Great Military Power (1981), examines reformers and modernizers
 Coffman, Edward M. The Old Army: A Portrait of the American Army in Peacetime, 1784–1898 (1986).
 Cosmas, Graham A. An Army for Empire: The United States Army and the Spanish–American War (1971), looks at organization, not combat
 Holmes, James R.  Theodore Roosevelt and World Order: Police Power in International Relations. (2006).
 Roosevelt, Theodore  The Naval War of 1812 (1900) systematic study of the US Navy's role in the War of 1812
 Trask, David F. The War with Spain in 1898 (1996), 654pp excerpt and text search, the most detailed scholarly coverage
 Utley, Robert M. Frontier Regulars; the United States Army and the Indian, 1866–1891 (1973)

World War I

 Chambers, John W., II. To Raise an Army: The Draft Comes to Modern America (1987)
 Clark, J. P. Preparing for War: The Emergence of the Modern U.S. Army, 1815–1917 (Harvard UP, 2017) 336 pp.
 Coffman, Edward M. The War to End All Wars: The American Military Experience in World War I (1998), a standard history
 Faulkner, Richard S. Pershing's Crusaders: The American Soldier in World War I (U Press of Kansas, 2017). xiv, 758 pp
 Freidel, Frank. Over There (1964), well illustrated history by scholar
 Hurley, Alfred F. Billy Mitchell, Crusader for Air Power (1975)
 Morrow, John H. Jr. A Yankee Ace in the RAF. The World War I Letters of Captain Boart Rogers (1996), Editor, . 
 Kennedy, David M. Over Here: The First World War and American Society (1982)
 Koistinen, Paul. Mobilizing for Modern War: The Political Economy of American Warfare, 1865–1919 (2004)
 Smythe, Donald. Pershing: General of the Armies (Indiana University Press, Bloomington, 1986) 
 Vandiver, Frank E. Black Jack: The Life and Times of John J. Pershing – Volume II (Texas A&M University Press, Third printing, 1977) 
 Venzon, Anne ed. The United States in the First World War: An Encyclopedia (1995)
 Weigley, Russell Frank. History of the United States army (1967)
 Woodward, David R. The American Army and the First World War (Cambridge University Press, 2014). 484 pp. online review

Interwar

 Coffman, Edward M. The Regulars: The American Army, 1898–1941 (2007) excerpt and text search
  Koistinen, Paul A. C. Planning War, Pursuing Peace: The Political Economy of American Warfare, 1920–1939 (1998)   excerpt and text search

World War II

 Ambrose, Stephen. The Supreme Commander: The War Years of Dwight D. Eisenhower (1999)  excerpt and text search
 James, D. Clayton. The Years of Macarthur 1941–1945 (1975), vol 2. of standard scholarly biography
 Koistinen, Paul A. C. Arsenal of World War II: the political economy of American warfare, 1940–1945? (2004)
 Larrabee, Eric. Commander in Chief: Franklin Delano Roosevelt, His Lieutenants, and Their War (2004), chapters on all the key American war leaders  excerpt and text search
 Morison, Two-Ocean War: A Short History of the United States Navy in the Second World War (2007)
 Perret, Geoffrey. There's a War to Be Won: The United States Army in World War II (1997)
 Perret, Geoffrey. Winged Victory: The Army Air Forces in World War II (1997)
 Pogue, Forrest. George C. Marshall: Ordeal and Hope, 1939–1942 (1999); George C. Marshall: Organizer of Victory, 1943–1945 (1999); standard scholarly biography
 Potter, E. B.  Nimitz.  (1976).
 Sherrod, Robert Lee. History of Marine Corps Aviation in World War II (1987)
 Spector, Ronald. Eagle Against the Sun: The American War With Japan (1985)
 Weigley,  Russell. Eisenhower's Lieutenants: The Campaigns of France and Germany, 1944–45 (1990)
 Weinberg, Gerhard L. A World at Arms: A Global History of World War II (1994). Global history of the war; strong on diplomacy of FDR and other main leaders

Cold War

 Atkins, Stephen E.  Historical Encyclopedia of Atomic Energy. (2000). 491 pp.
 Bacevich, Andrew J., ed. The Long War: A New History of U.S. National Security Policy Since World War II (2007)  excerpt and text search
 Bundy, McGeorge. Danger and Survival: Choices About the Bomb in the First Fifty Years (1988).
 Friedman, Norman. The Fifty Year War: Conflict and Strategy in the Cold War. (2000) excerpt and text search
 Gaddis, John Lewis. Strategies of Containment: A Critical Appraisal of Postwar American National Security Policy (1982) online edition; also excerpt and text search
 Goldfischer, David.  The Best Defense: Policy Alternatives for U.S. Nuclear Security from the 1950s to the 1990s. (1993). 283 pp.
 Isenberg, Michael T. Shield of the Republic: The United States Navy in an Era of Cold War and Violent Peace 1945–1962 (1993)
 Lewis, Adrian R. The American Culture of War: The History of U.S. Military Force from World War II to Operation Iraqi Freedom (2006)  excerpt and text search
 Williamson, Samuel R., Jr. and Reardon, Steven L.  The Origins of U.S. Nuclear Strategy, 1945–1953. (1993). 224 pp.

Korea and Vietnam

 Anderson, David L. Columbia Guide to the Vietnam War (2004).
 Brune, Lester H. ed. The Korean War: Handbook of the Literature and Research (1996) online edition
 Herring, George C. America's Longest War: The United States and Vietnam, 1950–1975 (4th ed 2001), most widely used short history.
 Kutler, Stanley ed. Encyclopedia of the Vietnam War (1996). essays by experts
 
  Schulzinger, Robert D. Time for War: The United States and Vietnam, 1941–1975. (1997) online edition
 Tucker, Spencer. ed. Encyclopedia of the Vietnam War (1998) 3 vol. reference set; also one-volume abridgement (2001).
 Tucker, Spencer. Vietnam. (1999) 226pp. online edition
 Tucker, Spencer, ed. Encyclopedia of the Korean War (2002)
 The Pentagon Papers (Gravel ed. 5 vol 1971); combination of narrative and secret documents compiled by Pentagon. excerpts

See also 
 Bibliography of the American Civil War
 Bibliography of the American Revolutionary War
 Bibliography of Canadian military history
 Bibliography of works on the United States military and LGBT+ topics

External links
American War and Military Operations Casualties: Lists and Statistics, by Nese F. DeBruyne, Senior Research Librarian, Congressional Research Service.
Instances of Use of United States Forces Abroad, 1798–2017, by Barbara Salazar Torreon, Senior Research Librarian, Congressional Research Service.
U.S. Periods of War and Dates of Recent Conflicts, by Barbara Salazar Torreon, Senior Research Librarian, Congressional Research Service.
List of small wars and small operations

United States military history